is a former Japanese football player.

Club statistics

References

External links

J. League

1981 births
Living people
Ryutsu Keizai University alumni
Association football people from Mie Prefecture
Japanese footballers
J2 League players
Japan Football League players
Sagawa Shiga FC players
Shonan Bellmare players
Blaublitz Akita players
Nara Club players
Association football midfielders